NGC 4349 is an open cluster in the constellation Crux. It was discovered by James Dunlop in 1826. It is located approximately 7,000 light years away from Earth.

Characteristics 
There are 390 probable member stars within the angular radius of the cluster and 129 within the central part of the cluster. The tidal radius of the cluster is 17.8 - 22.8 parsecs (58 - 75 light years) and represents the average outer limit of NGC 4349, beyond which a star is unlikely to remain gravitationally bound to the cluster core. One blue straggler has been detected in the cluster. There are four Cepheid variables in the direction of the cluster, among them R and T Crucis, which, however, are not members of the cluster. R Crucis lies 16 arcminutes from the centre of the open cluster NGC 4349, which is beyond the outer limit of the cluster, and is estimated to be nearly 1 kpc closer to Earth than the cluster. The cluster has subsolar metallicity (−0.12  ±  0.06).

A brown dwarf with minimum mass 19,8 times larger than that of Jupiter has been detected orbiting star no. 127 (vmag. 10,88 and with mass 3.9 ) every 678 days. At the time of discovery, star NGC 4349 No. 127 was the heaviest star with an accurate mass determination around which a substellar companion had been detected, and also one of the youngest systems known.

References

External links 

4349
Crux (constellation)
Open clusters